The Gadsden County paleontological sites are assemblages of Early Miocene invertebrates and vertebrates occurring in Gadsden County, Florida, United States.

Age
Era: Neogene
Period: Early Miocene
Faunal stage: Hemingfordian ~20.6—16.3 Mya, calculates to a period of approximately 
Geologic formation: Torreya Formation

Sites

Gadsden County paleontological sites are represented by the following:
La Camelia Site. Time period: 17.7 Mya. (AEO)
Midway Site. Time period: ~18.9—18.8 Mya. 
Milwhite Gunn Farm Site. Time period: ~17.0 Mya. (AEO)
Quincy Site. Time period: ~17.0 Mya. (AEO)
Coordinates:

Genus and species identified
La Camelia site = LCS. Midway site. = MIS. Milwhite Gunn Farfm Site. Marks River site = MGFD. Quincy site = QUI.

Reptiles and amphibians
Batrachosauroides B. dissimulans (amphibian) MGFD
Colubrinae (snake) MGFD
Natricinae (snake) MGFD
Scincidae (skink) MGFD
Cnemidophorus (racerunner lizard).MGFD.
Heloderma (Gila monster type poisonous lizard) LCS
Leiocephalus (lizard) MGFD

Mammals

Carnivores
Amphicyon pontoni (bear-dog) MIS
Borophaginae (proto-dog) MIS
Procyon (raccoon) MIS

Herbivores
Acritohippus isonesus (horse) LCS
Anchitherium clarencei MIS
Aphelops (rhinoceros) LCS, MIS, MGFD
Archaeohippus blackbergi
Blastomeryx (musk deer) MIS
Bouromeryx americanus (deer-like) LCS
Harrymys magnus (kangaroo rat) MIS
Lantanotherium (gymnure) MGFD
Copemys (hamster-like rodents) MGFD
Metaxytherium crataegense (sea cow) LCS, MGFD
Merychippus gunteri (horse) LCS, MGFD, QUI
Merychippus primus (horse) LCS, MGFD
Mylagaulus (horned rodent) MIS, MGFD
Nanosiren (sea cow) MIS
Merycoidodontidae (oreodont) MIS
Perognathus minutus (mouse) MGFD
Proheteromys floridanus (kangaroo rat) MIS, MGFD
Prosynthetoceras texanus (deer-like) MIS
Prosthennops xiphodonticus (deer-like). LCS
Rakomeryx (deer-like) LCS

References
Bryant, J. D., Journal of Vertebrate Paleontology 11(4). 1991
Simpson, G. G., 1932. Bulletin of the Florida State Geological Survey 10.
New Early Barstovian (Middle Miocene) Vertebrates from the Upper Torreya Formation, Eastern Florida Panhandle, J. Daniel Bryant, Journal of Vertebrate Paleontology, Vol. 11, No. 4 (Dec. 31, 1991), pp. 472–489.
Paleobiology Database : Gunn Farm Collection, John Alroy.
Paleobiology Datatabase: Midway Collection, Alroy.
Olson, Stanley J., Florida Geological Survey,Fossil Mammals of Florida, 1959 .

Miocene United States
Miocene paleontological sites of North America
Neogene Florida
Paleontological sites of Florida
Natural history of Florida
Geography of Gadsden County, Florida